This article refers to one of the former prefectures of Chad. From 2002 the country was divided into 18 regions.

Kanem was one of the 14 prefectures of Chad. Located in the west of the country, Kanem covered an area of 114,520 square kilometers and had a population of 279,927 in 1993. Its capital was Mao.

References

Prefectures of Chad